Hazel Doupe (born 12 November 2002) is an Irish actress. She is best known for her breakthrough role as Frances in the 2018 coming-of-age film Float Like a Butterfly.

Early life
Doupe was born in Dublin.

Career
Doupe started her career as a guest star in the episode Shot Down of the second series of the TV3 drama series Jack Taylor. In 2015, Doupe starred as Wendy Darling/Lucy Rose in the modern day television adaption of Peter Pan, which was broadcast on 26 December 2015 on ITV. In 2017, she starred in Michael Inside.

She is best known for her role as Frances, an Irish Traveller teen who idolises boxing legend Muhammad Ali and trains herself to become a boxer in the 2018 film Float Like a Butterfly, which premiered at the 2018 Toronto International Film Festival. On portraying her character in the film, Doupe explained that "The main concern of mine was, it wasn't solely to be amazing in this performance, it wasn't to be good, it was to be true to the character, to present her in a realistic way, my priority was to portray her as a real hero and it's so different to the heroes we see on screen."

In 2021, Doupe portrayed Ingrid in the RTÉ One thriller drama series Smother, which also starred Dervla Kirwan, Niamh Walsh, Seána Kerslake and Gemma-Leah Devereux . In an interview with Entertainment.ie, regards of her casting in the series, Doupe stated:

Doupe starred in You Are Not My Mother and The Ulysses Project.

Filmography

Television

Film

References

External links 

Living people
2002 births
21st-century Irish actresses
Irish film actresses
Irish child actresses
Irish television actresses
Actresses from Dublin (city)